Rosario Tindaro Fiorello (born 16 May 1960), known just as Fiorello, is an Italian comedian, singer, radio, and television presenter.

Career
Fiorello was born in Catania, Sicily, and raised in Augusta, Sicily. He began his career working in tourist villages, first as a barman, and then as an entertainer. Near the end of the 1980s, Fiorello was brought to Milan by Bernardo Cherubini, whom he had met in Valtur Villages. Bernardo, brother of Jovanotti, who introduced him to Claudio Cecchetto, who directed Radio Deejay and where he met Antonio Germinario, a talent-scout, that become his manager for many years. Soon afterwards, Fiorello began hosting the show "Viva Radio Deejay" with Marco Baldini.

Having become popular through the TV show Karaoke, Fiorello went on to host various TV shows. Soon after, he endured a period of drug problems that kept him away from the world of TV. However, he returned to show business and television in the 1990s, displaying great abilities as a showman, first in the Mediaset networks, then with RAI in 2001, 2002, and 2004 with Stasera Pago Io.

Since 2002, Fiorello has hosted the radio broadcast Viva Radio 2 together with Marco Baldini and the musician Enrico Cremonesi, during which Fiorello shows off his skills as a singer, mimic and entertainer. The authors of the program were Rosario Fiorello with Marco Baldini, Francesco Bozzi, Alberto De Risio, Riccardo Cassini and Federico Taddia. In the summer of 2003, was published the 1st of a long series of CD's that collected the best of his radio show. The CD's included the imitation of: Mike Bongiorno and the Forgetful of Cologno (Berlusconi), Andrea Camilleri, Antonio Cassano, Carlo Azeglio Ciampi, Gianni Minà, Franco Califano, Carla Bruni, Oliviero Toscani, Marina Flaibani from Onda Verde, Nanni Moretti, Vittorio Cecchi Gori, Ignazio La Russa, the prince Albert of Monaco, Monica Bellucci and her husband Vincent Cassel and many more.
In 2007 Fiorello and Baldini realized the single Chi Siamo Noi, that included many gags of their radio show Viva Radio 2, the song was written by Rosario Fiorello, Corrado Rizza, Domenico Scuteri and Luca Leonori and it was in the Italian pop chart.

Fiorello's skills as a vocalist have brought him to the cinema as well. He has participated in such varied roles as: a dubber in cartoons (most recently Garfield), to an appearance in the film The Talented Mr. Ripley, in the role of Fausto, a young Italian friend of the main characters.

His younger brother Giuseppe Fiorello is an actor.

In 2008 came out the compilation "Pronto c'e’ Mike" with his gags on the phone with Mike Bongiorno during the radio show "Viva Radio 2", with a book written by Aldo Grasso. On 14 November 2011 Fiorello back on television with a new program entitled "Il più grande spettacolo dopo il weekend" (inspired by the song "Il più grande spettacolo dopo il Big Bang" of his friend Lorenzo Jovanotti). The first episode showed excellent results, with 10 million viewers and almost 40% share. The data, already outstanding, to further improve in the second episode (with over 12 million viewers and a share of almost 43% [10]) and third (almost 12 million viewers and over 43% share).

Impressions and characters

Fiorello's most famous imitations include Mike Bongiorno, and that of Silvio Berlusconi as a character called Smemorato di Cologno who, in the parody, loses his memory every time something related to communism is mentioned. Smemorato di Cologno is a pun on the main character of the Italian comedy 'Lo smemorato di Collegno', Cologno being instead the headquarters of Berlusconi's well-known media company.

Other famous impressions and characters include:
 Albert II, Prince of Monaco
 Andrea Camilleri, an Italian writer
 The Signorina buonasera, a RAI announcer
 Antonio Cassano, an Italian Football player
 Avvocato Messina, a lawyer who defends his clients with absurd pleas
 Barbara Palombelli, an Italian journalist
 Bruno Vespa, an Italian journalist
 Carla Bruni
 Carlo Azeglio Ciampi, former President
 Federico Moccia, an Italian writer
 Franco Battiato, an Italian singer/songwriter
Franco Califano, an Italian singer/songwriter
 Gianni Minà, an Italian journalist
 Gianni Morandi, an Italian singer
 Giorgio Napolitano, current President
 Giovanni Muciaccia, the presenter of the TV program Art Attack
 Giulietto e Romeo, two gay truck drivers
 Kim Jong-il
 Kimi Räikkönen
 Ignazio La Russa, an Italian politician
Luciano Pavarotti, Italian Operatic Tenor
 Maurizio Costanzo
 Marco Carta, an Italian singer who won the Sanremo Music Festival in 2009
 Marina Flaibani of the radio program Onda Verde
 Martano Volpi, a mad man from Tuscany
 Monica Bellucci
 The "mostroinviato" (monster-correspondent), which in Italian sounds like "nostro inviato" (our correspondent)
 Nanni Moretti, an Italian director and actor
 Oliviero Toscani, an Italian photographer
 Paolo Fava, an imaginary jazz player
 Padre Georg, Benedetto XVI's secretary
 Recep Tayyip Erdoğan
 The hunchback of Notre Dame, a character of Riccardo Cocciante's musical
 The tenor Roberto Alagna
 Roberto Cavalli
 Romano Prodi, former Prime Minister
 Silvio Berlusconi
 Silvio Muccino as Sasha
 Tony Sperandeo, an Italian character actor famous for his stereotypical gangster roles
 Umberto Eco
 Valerio Staffelli, a journalist from the TV program Striscia la notizia
 Vincent Cassel
 Vittorio Cecchi Gori
 Vladimir Putin

During 16 May 2006 episode, on Fiorello's birthday, Carlo Azeglio Ciampi called to wish him a happy birthday and to congratulate him for his impression, especially for the fact that Ciampi doesn't always pronounce clearly the last syllable of some words.

During November 2006 the newspaper Avvenire (linked with CEI) criticized Fiorello for his impression of Padre Georg. Most of the journalists admitted that they had never listened to the radio program directly.

Discography

Singles 
 La canzone del sole (1991)
 Azzurro (1991)
 Una carezza in un pugno (1992)
 Si o No (Please don't go) (1993)
 Spiagge (1993)
 Puoi (1993)
 Mare Nostrum (1993)
 Finalmente tu (1995)
 Ridi (1995)
 Dimmi dimmi perché (1998)
 Vivere a colori (1998)
 Città vuota (2004)
 L'appuntamento (2005)

Album 
 Veramente falso (1991)
 Nuovamente falso (1992)
 Spiagge e lune (1993)
 Karaoke Compilation (1993)
 Finalmente tu (1995)
 Saro Fiorello (1996)
 Dai miei amici cantautori (1997)
 Batticuore (1998)
 I miei amici cantautori (2000)
 Fiorello the Greatest (2002)
 A modo mio (2004)

Duets 
 With Caterina: Il cielo – Favola semplice, (1994)
 With 360 Gradi: E poi... non ti ho vista più 2003 
 With Marco Baldini: Chi siamo noi (dall'album Chi siamo noi – Gli inediti di Viva Radio 2) 2007 
 With Giorgia: Più (dall'album Spirito libero - Viaggi di voce 1992-2008) 2008 
 With Claudio Baglioni: Porta Portese (dall'album QPGA) 2009 
 With Max Pezzali: Sei un mito (dall'album Max 20) 2013 
 With Mina: Baby, It's Cold Outside (dall'album Christmas Song Book 2013 
 With Matteo Brancaleoni and Fabrizio Bosso: "L'italiano" (from the album Made in Italy) 2015 
 With Daniele Lazzarin|Danti: Fatti mandare dalla mamma 2017

Compilation 
 Uno è famoso, l'altro no: il meglio di Viva Radio2 CD + LIBRO (2002)
 Viva Radio 2 (il meglio del 2003) (2003)
 Viva Radio 2 (il meglio del 2005) (2005)
 Viva Radio Deejay - Il meglio di... (2006)
 Viva Radio 2 (il meglio del 2006) (2006)
 Fiorello e Baldini visti da dietro (2006) – DVD –
 Viva Radio 2 (il meglio del 2007) (2007)
 Chi Siamo Noi (Gli inediti di Viva Radio 2) (2007)
 Pronto c'è Mike: Telefonate al "vero" Mike Bongiorno con libro di Aldo Grasso (2008)
 Viva Radio 2 (il meglio del 2008) (2008)

Filmography

Films

Television

See also
Viva Radio 2

References

External links

 Official website
 https://www.imdb.com/name/nm0278502/
 https://www.discogs.com/artist/71521-Fiorello?page=2

1960 births
Living people
Mass media people from Catania
People from the Province of Syracuse
People from Taormina
Italian male singers
Italian impressionists (entertainers)
Italian television personalities
Italian radio personalities